The 2017 Axalta presents the Pocono 400 was a Monster Energy NASCAR Cup Series race held on June 11, 2017 at Pocono Raceway in Long Pond, Pennsylvania. The race was contested over 160 laps on the  triangular superspeedway, and was the 14th race of the 2017 Monster Energy NASCAR Cup Series season.

Report

Background

The race was held at Pocono Raceway, which is a three-turn superspeedway located in Long Pond, Pennsylvania. The track hosts two annual Monster Energy NASCAR Cup Series races: the Axalta presents the Pocono 400 and the Pennsylvania 400, as well as one Xfinity Series and Camping World Truck Series event.  Since 2013, the track is also host to a Verizon IndyCar Series race.

Pocono Raceway is one of a very few NASCAR tracks not owned by either Speedway Motorsports, Inc. or International Speedway Corporation. It is operated by the Igdalsky siblings Brandon, Nicholas, and sister Ashley, and cousins Joseph IV and Chase Mattioli, all of whom are third-generation members of the family-owned Mattco Inc, started by Joseph II and Rose Mattioli.

Outside of the NASCAR races, the track is used throughout the year by Sports Car Club of America (SCCA) and motorcycle clubs as well as racing schools and an IndyCar race. The triangular oval also has three separate infield sections of racetrack – North Course, East Course and South Course. Each of these infield sections use a separate portion of the tri-oval to complete the track. During regular non-race weekends, multiple clubs can use the track by running on different infield sections.  Also some of the infield sections can be run in either direction, or multiple infield sections can be put together – such as running the North Course and the South Course and using the tri-oval to connect the two.

Entry list

First practice

Qualifying

Qualifying results

Final practice

Race

First stage
Kyle Busch led the field to the green flag at 3:22 p.m. Aside from an unscheduled pit stop by Joey Logano for a flat left-rear tire on the sixth lap, nothing unusual happened in the early stage of the race. It proceeded in an orderly fashion, only interrupted by a cycle of green flag stops on lap 14. Busch pitted from the lead on lap 18, followed by Kyle Larson pitted the next lap, and the lead moved to Erik Jones. He pitted on lap 36 and the lead cycled back to Busch. During the pit cycle, Ryan Newman and Darrell Wallace Jr. were handed pass through penalties for speeding on pit road. Both served them, but Wallace was hit with a second penalty – a stop and go – for speeding while completing his pass through.

Busch drove on to win the first stage and caution flew for the first time in the race on lap 50 for the culmination of the stage. Ricky Stenhouse Jr. took the lead under the caution by opting not to pit when the leaders did.

Second stage
When the race returned to green on lap 57, Jones – on fresher tires – took the lead from Stenhouse driving down the Long Pond Straightaway. At the start/finish line the following lap, Dale Earnhardt Jr.'s engine blew up as a result of a mis-shift and transmission failure. Moments later, Clint Bowyer tagged the wall with his right-rear corner exiting Turn 1. After those two events and Busch retaking the lead on lap 62, however, the second stage continued just as the first did. It was only broken up by a cycle of green flag stops on lap 91 when Busch pitted from the lead. Teammate Denny Hamlin followed suite the subsequent lap, giving the lead to Larson. On the 96th lap, Jimmie Johnson – running seventh – suffered brake failure hurdling down the frontstretch. He turned his car down into the grass to bleed off speed, which then turned up the track and slammed the wall hard in Turn 1. Moments later, Jamie McMurray suffered a similar brake failure going into Turn 1 and also pounded the Turn 1 wall. His car continued rolling down the Long Pond Straightaway when it caught fire in the engine compartment, prompting McMurray to park it on the apron and quickly exit the burning vehicle. These two events brought out the second caution, as well as a 23-minute and 25-second red flag to facilitate cleanup.

Rather than run out the remaining four laps of the stage under caution, NASCAR decided to run a one-lap shootout to end it. It restarted on lap 99, Larson won the second stage and caution flew for the third time for the conclusion of the stage. Busch bypassed pit road under the caution, having just pitted a few laps prior, and took back the lead.

Final stage

Back to green with 55 laps to go, the race settled into an orderly procession. As was the case in the first and second stage, the race was only broken up when race leader Busch commenced a cycle of green flag stops with 36 to go. Martin Truex Jr. did so as well four laps later, handing the lead to Brad Keselowski. He stayed out for 12 laps hoping to catch a caution, but didn't, pitted with 20 to go. Kasey Kahne suffered brake failure the following lap and belted the wall in Turn 1, bringing out the fourth caution. Busch opted not to pit and took the lead, as did Keselowski, while rest of the field pitted and Jones exited pit road first by taking two tires, followed by Ryan Blaney and everyone else taking 4 tires.

On the ensuing restart with 13 to go, Busch bolted ahead as Keselowski faltered. Blaney quickly pounced on and took second from Keselowski. Blaney on his fresher tires closed the gap to Busch on worn tires coming to 10 to go. After crossing the start/finish line, Blaney dropped down to the bottom of the track to pass to give himself the preferred groove going into Turn 1, but Busch blocked his move on the frontstretch and the battle continued. Blaney got to Busch's inside exiting Turn 1 and made contact going down the Long Pond Straightaway, even took the battle onto the apron. Blaney backed out going into Turn 2, but Busch left the bottom open, letting Blaney get back to his inside exiting Turn 2 and lost the lead to him on the Short Chute. Blaney spent the remaining nine laps holding off a charging Kevin Harvick to score his first ever victory and first for the Wood Brothers since Trevor Bayne winning the Daytona 500 in 2011.

Race results

Stage results

Stage 1
Laps: 50

Stage 2
Laps: 50

Final stage results

Stage 3
Laps: 60

Race statistics
 Lead changes: 9 among different drivers
 Cautions/Laps: 4 for 18
 Red flags: 1 for 23 minutes and 25 seconds
 Time of race: 2 hours, 48 minutes and 40 seconds
 Average speed:

Media

Television 
Fox NASCAR televised the race in the United States on FS1 for the third consecutive year. Mike Joy was the lap-by-lap announcer, while six-time Pocono winner, Jeff Gordon and four-time winner Darrell Waltrip were the color commentators. Jamie Little, Chris Neville and Matt Yocum reported from pit lane during the race.

Radio 
Radio coverage of the race was broadcast by Motor Racing Network (MRN) and simulcasted on Sirius XM NASCAR Radio. Joe Moore, Jeff Striegle and four-time Pocono winner Rusty Wallace announced the race in the booth while the field was racing on the front stretch. Dave Moody called the race from atop a billboard outside of turn 1 when the field was racing through turn 1 while Mike Bagley called the race from a billboard outside turn 2 when the field was racing through turn 2. Kyle Rickey reported the race from a billboard outside turn 3 when the field was racing through turn 3. Alex Hayden, Winston Kelley and Steve Post reported from pit lane during the race.

Standings after the race

Drivers' Championship standings

Manufacturers' Championship standings

Note: Only the first 16 positions are included for the driver standings.
. – Driver has clinched a position in the Monster Energy NASCAR Cup Series playoffs.

References

Axalta presents the Pocono 400
Axalta presents the Pocono 400
Axalta presents the Pocono 400
NASCAR races at Pocono Raceway